Symphionema montanum is a shrub endemic to New South Wales in eastern Australia. It is one of the many species authored by Robert Brown.

References

External links

Flora of New South Wales
Endemic flora of Australia
Plants described in 1810
montanum